Horace Deighton (born 20 September 1831 – date of death unknown) was a Trinidadian cricketer. He played in two first-class matches for Trinidad and Tobago in 1868/69.

See also
 List of Trinidadian representative cricketers

References

External links
 

1831 births
Year of death missing
Trinidad and Tobago cricketers